The Abakan (Ağban), (from the Khakas word for "bear's blood") is a river in the Republic of Khakassia, Russia. It is a left tributary of the Yenisey. The river is used for log driving and irrigation. The city of Abakan is located at the confluence of the Abakan and the Yenisey.

Course
It is formed by the confluence of the rivers Bolshoy Abakan and Maly Abakan. It rises in the western Sayan Mountains and flows northeast through the Minusinsk Depression to the Yenisey.

See also
List of rivers of Russia

References

Further reading

Rivers of Khakassia